The Leeds elections were held on 8 May 1970, with one third of the seats up for election, as well as an extra vacancy in Beeston.

The election seen a nationally resurgent Labour gain 10 seats and achieve a 13% swing from the Conservatives, returning to a competitive status after the routings suffered the previous two elections. Labour gains were as follows: Bramley, Burmantofts, Gipton, Osmondthorpe, Richmond Hill, Scott Hall, Seacroft, Stanningley, Whinmoor and Wortley. There was also a narrow hold in Burley, with Labour close to eliminating the almost 40% Conservative majority managed there the year before. The Liberals further increased their representation with a gain from the Conservatives, repeating their success in West Hunslet following the previous year's upset.

Election result

The result had the following consequences for the total number of seats on the Council after the elections:

Ward results

References

1970 English local elections
1970
1970s in Leeds